The 1964–65 Luxembourg National Division was the 51st season of top level association football in Luxembourg. Aris Bonnevoie went into the season as defending champions, having won their first title the previous season.

Overview
It consisted of 12 teams, and Stade Dudelange won the championship by a margin of just a single point.

League standings

Results

References
Luxembourg - List of final tables (RSSSF)

Luxembourg National Division seasons
Lux
Nat